Vasco Velankanni weekly Express is an Express rail operated by the Indian Railways connecting Vasco da Gama in Goa with Velankanni via Madgaon, Hubli Junction, Yesvantpur, Salem Junction, Karur Junction, Tiruchirappalli Junction, Thanjavur Junction, Thiruvarur Junction and Nagapattinam Junction.
train take 30 hrs 15 min to complete the entire journey. Total Distance Covered is 1268 KM at an average Speed of 42 KM/hr.

Demands
There are demands by the devotes who visits the velankanni shrine regularly, insist Indian Railways to operate this train to reach velankanni on Sundays instead of Tuesdays and to depart this train from velankanni on Sundays instead of Tuesdays with no change in time table and also demand to stop this train at Tiruppattur.

See also
 Pallavan Express
 Rockfort Express

Transport in Vasco da Gama, Goa
Transport in Nagapattinam
Express trains in India
Rail transport in Goa
Rail transport in Tamil Nadu
Rail transport in Karnataka

Coach Composition

The train has standard ICF rakes with max speed of 110 kmph.

 2 AC III Tier
 11 Sleeper Coaches
 5 General
 2 Second-class Luggage/parcel van